The Little Swan Island hutia (Geocapromys thoracatus) is an extinct species of rodent that lived on Little Swan Island, off northeastern Honduras in the Caribbean. It was a slow-moving, guinea-pig-like rodent and probably emerged from caves and limestone crevices to forage on bark, small twigs and leaves.

Taxonomy
It may have been a subspecies of the Jamaican hutia (Geocapromys browni), whose ancestors were carried to the island from Jamaica, 5,000–7,000 years ago. It was fairly common in the early 20th century, but disappeared after a severe hurricane (Hurricane Janet) in 1955, followed by the introduction of house cats to the island.

References

A Gap in Nature by Tim Flannery and Peter Schouten (2001), published by William Heinemann

Geocapromys
Hutia, Little Swan Island
Mammals of the Caribbean
Hutia, Little Swan Island
Rodent extinctions since 1500
Extinct rodents
Mammals described in 1888
Taxa named by Frederick W. True